was a town located in Miyoshi District, Tokushima Prefecture, Japan.

As of 2003, the town had an estimated population of 5,044 and a density of 113.35 persons per km2. The total area was 44.5 km2.

On March 1, 2006, Ikawa, along with the towns of Ikeda, Mino and Yamashiro, and the villages of Higashiiyayama and Nishiiyayama (all from Miyoshi District), was merged to create the city of Miyoshi.

External links
 

Dissolved municipalities of Tokushima Prefecture
Miyoshi, Tokushima